In mathematical complex analysis, Schottky's theorem, introduced by  is a quantitative version of Picard's theorem. It states that for a holomorphic function f in the open unit disk that does not take the values 0 or 1, the value of |f(z)| can be bounded in terms of z and f(0).

Schottky's original theorem did not give an explicit bound for f.  gave some weak explicit bounds.  gave a strong explicit bound, showing that  if f is holomorphic in the open unit disk and does not take the values 0 or 1, then 
.

References

 

 
 
 
 

Theorems in complex analysis